Etzgen was a municipality in the district of Laufenburg in the canton of Aargau in Switzerland. On 1 January 2010, the municipalities of Hottwil, Etzgen, Mettau, Oberhofen AG and Wil AG merged into the municipality of Mettauertal.

Economy
, there were 163 workers who lived in the municipality. Of these, 119 or about 73.0% of the residents worked outside Etzgen while 112 people commuted into the municipality for work. There were a total of 156 jobs (of at least six hours per week) in the municipality.

References

External links

 

Former municipalities of Aargau
Populated places disestablished in 2010